The England women's national football team, also known as the Lionesses, have been governed by the Football Association (FA) since 1993, having been previously administered by the Women's Football Association (WFA). England played its first international match in November 1972 against Scotland. Although most national football teams represent a sovereign state, England is permitted by FIFA statutes, as a member of the United Kingdom's Home Nations, to maintain a national side that competes in all major tournaments, with the exception of the Women's Olympic Football Tournament.

England have qualified for the FIFA Women's World Cup seven times, reaching the quarter-finals in 1995, 2007 and 2011, finishing third in 2015 and fourth in 2019. Since 2019, England, as the highest-ranked Home Nation, have been able to qualify an Olympic team on behalf of Great Britain; other British players may be selected in the event of qualification. 

They reached the final of the UEFA Women's Championship in 1984 and 2009, and won in 2022, marking the first time since 1966 that any England senior football team had won a major championship.

History

Early years
The success of the men's national football team at the 1966 FIFA World Cup led to an upsurge of interest in football from women within England. The Women's Football Association (WFA) was established in 1969 as an attempt to organise the women's game. That same year, Harry Batt formed an independent English team that competed in the Fédération Internationale Européenne de Football Féminine (FIEFF) European Cup. Batt's team also participated in two FIEFF World Cups held in Italy (1970) and Mexico (1971).

Following an UEFA recommendation in 1972 for national associations to incorporate the women's game, the Football Association (FA) later that year rescinded its ban on women playing on English Football League grounds. Shortly after, Eric Worthington was tasked by the WFA to assemble an official women's national team. England competed in its first international match against Scotland in Greenock on 18 November 1972, 100 years to the month after the first men's international. The team overturned a two-goal deficit to defeat their northern opponents 3–2, with Sylvia Gore scoring England's first international goal. Pat Firth scored a hat-trick in an international against Scotland in 1973 among the 8–0 scoreline. Tom Tranter replaced Worthington as long term manager of the women's national football team and remained in that position for the next six years.

1979–1993: Progress under Reagan
Martin Reagan was appointed to replace Tranter in 1979. England reached the final of the inaugural European Competition for Women's Football, in 1984, after beating Denmark 3–1 on aggregate in the semi-finals. Despite resolute defending, including a spectacular goal line clearance from captain Carol Thomas, the England team lost the first away leg 1–0 against Sweden, after a header from Pia Sundhage, but won the second home leg by the same margin, with a goal from Linda Curl. England lost the subsequent penalty shootout 4–3. Theresa Wiseman saved Helen Johansson's penalty but both Curl and Lorraine Hanson had their spot kicks saved by Elisabeth Leidinge.

At the 1987 European Competition for Women's Football, England again reached the semi-finals but lost 3–2 after extra time against holders Sweden, in a repeat of the previous final. The team settled for fourth, after losing the third place play-off against Italy 2–1. Reagan was sacked after England's 6–1 quarter-final loss against Germany at UEFA Women's Euro 1991, which left them unable to qualify for the inaugural FIFA Women's World Cup. John Bilton was appointed as head coach in 1991 after Barrie Williams's brief tenure.

1993–1998: FA involvement
In 1993, the FA took over the running of women's football in England from the WFA, replacing Bilton with Ted Copeland as national team manager. England managed to qualify for UEFA Women's Euro 1995, having previously missed out on the last three editions, but were beaten 6–2 on aggregate over two legs against Germany. Reaching the European semi-finals granted England a place at the World Cup for the first time. The team advanced from the group stage of the 1995 FIFA Women's World Cup in Sweden, but lost out again to Germany 3–0 in the quarter-finals.

1998–2013: Development under Powell
Hope Powell became the team's first full-time head coach in June 1998, succeeding her former coach Copeland. The European Championship expanded in 1997 to eight teams and moved from a biennial event to a quadrennial one. England qualified via the play-offs for the 2001 competition held in Germany, despite recording their biggest loss (away against Norway 8–0) during qualification, but did not advance past the group stage. England automatically qualified as hosts in 2005, but again did not make it to the semi-finals.

Qualification for the World Cup changed for the 1999 edition. European qualifiers were introduced, so that teams no longer needed to rely on advancing to the latter stages of the European Championship. England qualified unbeaten for the 2007 World Cup in China, winning Group 5 in the European qualifiers and recording their biggest win (away against Hungary, 13–0) in the process, ending a 12-year hiatus from the competition. After coming second in their group, they advanced into the quarter-finals to face the United States but lost 3–0.

In May 2009, central contracts were implemented to help players focus on full-time training without having to fit it around full-time employment. Three months later, at the European Championships in Finland, England marked their return to the recently expanded 12-team competition by reaching the final for the first time in 25 years. They advanced from Group C to the quarter-finals by virtue of being the top third-placed team, beating both the hosts and the Netherlands in the knockout stage on the way to the final. There they lost 6–2 to reigning champions Germany.

England reached their third World Cup in 2011, having won Group 5 and their play-off 5–2 over two legs against Switzerland. In Germany, they topped Group B – ahead of eventual winners Japan. England were paired with France in the quarter-finals, with the match ending in a 1–1 draw. England had taken the lead with Jill Scott's chip, only to have Élise Bussaglia equalise with two minutes remaining. After extra time ended in stalemate, they lost the ensuing penalty shootout 4–3. Karen Bardsley had saved Camille Abily's initial penalty but misses by Claire Rafferty and Faye White sent England out of the competition.

Powell left the role in August 2013 after a poor showing at the UEFA Women's Euro 2013, with England bowing out after the group stage.

2013–2017: Sampson era 

Welshman Mark Sampson succeeded Powell as England manager. England qualified for their third successive World Cup in August 2014 with a game to spare, winning all ten matches and topping Group 6. England played their first international match at the new Wembley Stadium, home to the men's national team, in a friendly against the reigning European champions Germany on 23 November 2014. England had not played Germany since their heavy defeat in the European Championship final five years earlier. They lost the match 3–0, marking the 20th attempt at which England had failed to record an official win over Germany.

At the 2015 FIFA Women's World Cup in Canada, England lost their opening group game to France but won their remaining group games against Mexico and Colombia, easing through to the last 16 to play 1995 champions Norway. A 2–1 win set up a meeting with hosts Canada in the quarter-finals. Despite facing not only a strong Canadian team but a capacity partisan crowd at BC Place in Vancouver, England progressed to the semifinals of the Women's World Cup for the first time in their history with another 2–1 win, which also marked the first semifinal appearance by any England senior team since the men reached the last four of the 1990 World Cup in Italy. Playing reigning World Cup holders Japan in the semi-finals, England conceded a penalty kick, which Aya Miyama converted past Karen Bardsley. Japan then conceded a penalty as Yuki Ogimi clipped Steph Houghton and Fara Williams slotted it past Ayumi Kaihori to level the game. However, in the last minute of the game, Laura Bassett scored an own goal to send Japan through to the final. England eventually finished in third place by beating Germany 1–0 after extra time after a Williams penalty, their first time beating their archrivals in the women's game. It marked the best finish for any England senior team since the men's team famously won the 1966 World Cup as hosts.

England qualified for the UEFA Women's Euro 2017 in the Netherlands and won all three of their group games at the tournament. England beat France 1–0 in the quarter-finals before meeting hosts and eventual champions, the Netherlands. In the semi-finals, England conceded three goals without reply and were knocked out of the tournament.

In September 2017, Sampson was sacked from his role as manager by the FA after evidence of "inappropriate and unacceptable" behaviour was uncovered during his tenure at Bristol Academy. The FA in January 2019 agreed to pay a "significant" financial settlement to Sampson, on the week his claim for unfair dismissal was due to be heard in court. He was replaced by Phil Neville, who had played at Manchester United – including in their 1999 treble winning season – and Everton and been capped by the England men but had never before held a high-profile managing job.

2018–2021: Neville era

After being appointed manager, Neville's first games in charge were at the 2018 SheBelieves Cup. In their first game, England defeated France 4–1, then drew 2–2 against Germany. They went into the final game against the United States with the opportunity to win the tournament, but lost 1–0. Second place was the highest England had finished at the SheBelieves Cup.

England continued with World Cup qualification in 2018. On 6 April they drew 0–0 against Wales. After the qualifying games in June, England and Wales were guaranteed the first two spots in qualifying Group 1, and England's 3–0 win against Wales in August 2018 saw them clinch the group and qualify for the World Cup finals.

In the 2019 SheBelieves Cup, England won the tournament for the first time after winning their first match 2–1 against Brazil, drawing 2–2 with the United States and defeating Japan 3–0.

In the 2019 Women's World Cup in France, England won group D, beating local rivals Scotland and archrival Argentina to qualify for the knockout phase, before beating Japan. England beat both Cameroon and then Norway 3–0 to advance to the semifinal against United States in Lyon – the team's third straight major tournament semifinal. However, similar to the previous two tournaments, England once again failed to make the final, losing 2–1. Alex Morgan scored the winner after Ellen White had equalised following Christen Press' opening goal, while White had an equaliser ruled out by VAR and Houghton had a penalty saved by Alyssa Naeher. The team finished in fourth after losing the third place play-off to Sweden 2–1.

In March 2019 Winsford was chosen for the site of the £70m Cheshire FA Centre of Excellence, which will be the new home of the England Women's Football Team. It will also act as a training base for European teams playing in Liverpool and Manchester. The development was delayed by the COVID-19 pandemic in April 2020. In October 2020 the Prime Minister Boris Johnson gave his support for the development to go ahead; planning applications are expected to be submitted to Cheshire West and Chester Council in spring 2021 with a possible opening date of 2023. The site is being designed to revolutionise women's football in England.

In the wake of the World Cup exit, England's form dropped as the team struggled in a series of friendlies to end the year including a 2–1 defeat by Germany at Wembley Stadium on 9 November 2019. The game set a new record attendance for an England women's match at 77,768, becoming the second-biggest crowd for a women's game on English soil after the 2012 Olympic final which was watched by 80,203 at the same venue. The poor run continued into 2020 as England failed to defend their title at the 2020 SheBelieves Cup in March. Losses to the United States and Spain made it seven defeats in 11 games, the team's worst stretch since 2003, mounting further pressure on Neville, who admitted he was personally responsible for England's "unacceptable" form amid increased media scrutiny. In April 2020, Neville announced he would step down as manager when his contract expired in July 2021. Originally his tenure would have extended to England's hosting of UEFA Women's Euro 2021, but the tournament was postponed by a year due to the COVID-19 pandemic. 

An FA budget restructure at the end of 2020 saw the women's team become independent from the men's team for the first team, allowing more strategic freedom. In January 2021, Neville elected to resign early in order to take up the managerial position at Inter Miami, the Major League Soccer club founded by previous England men's captain David Beckham. As it had already been agreed that incumbent Netherlands manager Sarina Wiegman would be appointed to the role from September 2021, Hege Riise was named caretaker manager until then. Riise oversaw a 6–0 friendly win over Northern Ireland in her first game in charge.

From 2021: Wiegman era

On 14 August 2020, the FA announced it had reached a four-year deal with Netherlands manager Sarina Wiegman, who agreed to take over the team from September 2021, becoming the first non-British permanent manager. Entering as England began their 2023 FIFA Women's World Cup qualification, Wiegman wanted the team to be ruthless, beginning a streak of large winning goal margins in both competitive and friendly matches, including a "humiliating" defeat of the Netherlands. On 30 November 2021, during qualification for the 2023 World Cup, Ellen White became England's all-time record goals scorer (overtaking Kelly Smith), during a 20–0 win over Latvia, in which she scored a hat-trick. The game was a multi-record breaking game as three other players scored a hat-trick (Mead, Hemp (scored 4), and Russo), marking the first time four players had scored a hat-trick in a senior England women's game. The game was also the largest victory for either the men's or women's senior England sides, surpassing the women's team's 2005 13–0 win against Hungary and the men's 1882 13–0 win against Ireland.

England were drawn into Group A of Women's Euro 2022 as hosts and won each of the group stage matches: 1–0 against Austria at Old Trafford in Manchester; 8–0 against Norway at the Falmer Stadium in Brighton and Hove (a new European Championship record score); and 5–0 against Northern Ireland at St Mary's Stadium in Southampton. In the quarter-final, England recovered from being a goal behind against Spain to win 2–1 in extra time at the Falmer Stadium. In the semi-final at Bramall Lane in Sheffield, they defeated Sweden 4–0, the highlight of this match being a goal scored by Alessia Russo with an "instinctive backheel".

On 31 July, England defeated Germany 2–1 in extra time in the Women's Euro 2022 Final at Wembley, with Chloe Kelly's 110th-minute close-range goal from a corner being the decider after goals in normal time by Ella Toone for England and Lina Magull for Germany. It was the team's first-ever major trophy and was the first major international championship won by an England team (men's or women's) since 1966. The final was watched by a crowd of 87,192, a record for either the men's or women's European Championship.

Soon after Euro 2022, the England players wrote an open letter to Rishi Sunak and Liz Truss, the candidates in the ongoing Conservative Party leadership election, in which they declared their "legacy and goal was to inspire a nation". They saw their victory "as only the beginning". The letter pointed out that only 63% of British girls could play football in school PE lessons and concluded: "We – the 23 members of the England Senior Women's EURO Squad – ask you to make it a priority to invest in girls' football in schools, so that every girl has the choice".

With a further series of wins and draws including a friendly win against the United States at Wembley and qualifying for the 2023 Women's World Cup, the team ended 2022 having gone unbeaten for the calendar year. In December at BBC Sports Personality of the Year, Mead became the first female footballer to win the Sports Personality of the Year Award, with the team as a whole winning the Team of the Year Award and Wiegman winning the Sports Personality of the Year Coach Award. At The Best FIFA Football Awards 2022, held in February 2023, Mary Earps won the Best Women's Goalkeeper award; Wiegman won the Best Women's Coach award; and Mead, Williamson, Lucy Bronze and Keira Walsh were named to the World XI.

Team image

Nickname
The England women's national football team is widely nicknamed the Lionesses. The moniker was developed in-house by The Football Association's digital marketing department as a way of increasing the visibility and reach of the women's team to a dedicated women's football audience and community, particularly on social media. It was first used as a hashtag in June 2012 when the men's team was competing in UEFA Euro 2012 at the same time the women's team was playing a crucial UEFA Women's Euro 2013 qualifier against Netherlands in a bid to help differentiate the coverage and allow people to follow the women's team more easily without getting lost in conversation about the men which was using the same generic #ThreeLions branding at the time. The name started to be used organically by fans and media outlets before The Football Association adopted it as an official brand identity, including with commercial and licensing partners, ahead of the 2015 FIFA Women's World Cup.

The name was also used in an updated version of the popular English anthem "Three Lions" during England's ultimately successful Women's Euro 2022 run, which Fara Williams, Rachel Yankey, Faye White, Rachel Brown and Anita Asante performed along with Chelcee Grimes and original artists Lightning Seeds and David Baddiel (with another original artist, Frank Skinner, in attendance).

Media coverage and promotion 
The 2019 media campaign in announcing the World Cup squad was part of a broad marketing ambition to make the players into more recognisable stars to promote the team, the competition, and women's football. Using celebrities with connections to the players to make social media facing announcements, the marketing agency received praise for the campaign, which successfully increased social media engagement.

A documentary film, The Lionesses: How Football Came Home, was produced about the 2022 Euro win and released later that year. It has been reported that the team's campaign at the 2023 World Cup will also be given a documentary.

England matches at selected international tournaments are currently broadcast by ITV Sport (excluding Euro and World Cup finals) and BBC (major finals). Previously, the Euro and World Cup finals were broadcast by Channel 4 (Euro 2017 only) and Eurosport.

Collective honours

World Cup teams 
In 2015, the World Cup squad won the BT Sport Action Woman Awards Team of the Year award.

In 2019, the World Cup squad won the GQ Men of the Year Inspiration Award.

2022 Euro team 
The 23-player squad and coach Sarina Wiegman who won the 2022 Euro, the women's team's first major international title, received several honours that year, including:

 Freedom of the City of London (as individuals)
 Pride of Britain Awards (2022): Inspiration Award
 BT Sport Action Woman Awards: Team of the Year
 Northwest Football Awards: Billy Seymour Impact Award
 Manchester City of Champions Awards: Hall of Fame induction
 Just A Ball Game? LGBT+ inclusion and visibility award
 Sports Journalists' Association Awards: Team of the Year
 BBC Sports Personality of the Year (2022): Team of the Year Award
 Laureus World Sports Awards: Team of the Year (pending)

Results and fixtures

This list includes match results from the past 12 months, as well as any future matches that have been scheduled.
All times are listed in GMT except where noted.

Legend

2022

2023

Coaching staff

Current information

Managerial history

Players

Caps, goals, and recent players may be outdated or incorrect, as the FA does not maintain a database of historical statistics.

Current squad
The following 26 players were named to the squad for the 2023 Arnold Clark Cup.

Caps and goals are correct as of match played 22 February 2023 against .

Recent call-ups
The following players have also been called up to the England squad within the last 12 months.

  = Withdrew due to injury
  = Preliminary squad
  = Withdrew on medical grounds
  =  Player withdrew from the squad due to non-injury or medical issue.

Team captains

Since 1972, there have been eleven permanent captains and twenty-six known captains.
 Bold indicates current captain
Italics indicates still-active players
 indicates player was captain for matches under the Women's Football Association

Records

Most capped players

Top goalscorers

Carol Thomas was the first player to reach 50 caps in 1985, before retiring from representative football later that year, having amassed 56 caps. Fara Williams holds the record for England appearances, having played 172 times since 2001. She overtook previous record holder Rachel Yankey in August 2014, in a friendly against Sweden. Yankey had passed Gillian Coultard's 119 record England women caps in September 2012, in a European qualifying match against Croatia, and Peter Shilton's 125 record England international caps in June 2013, in a friendly against Japan.

Ellen White has scored the most goals for England, with 52. She surpassed Kelly Smith's record on 30 November 2021, scoring a hat-trick against Latvia during a UEFA qualifier for the 2023 FIFA Women's World Cup where England won 20–0, the Lionesses' biggest-ever competitive win.

Attendance

In England only

Competitive record

FIFA World Cup

England have qualified for the FIFA Women's World Cup six times (1995, 2007, 2011, 2015, 2019, 2023) and failed to qualify for three competitions (1991, 1999, 2003). The England team reached the quarter-finals on three occasions; losing out to Germany in 1995, the United States in 2007 and France on penalties in 2011. In 2015, however, England earned the bronze medal for the first time, under Mark Sampson, by beating Germany in the third place play-off. The team finished in fourth place in 2019.

*Draws include knockout matches decided by penalty shoot-outs.

Olympic Games

England does not participate in the Women's Olympic Football Tournament, as the country does not have its own National Olympic Committee (NOC). Since England falls under the jurisdiction of the British Olympic Association, remit for an Olympic football team requires support from all four Home Nation associations. The Scottish Football Association (SFA), the Football Association of Wales (FAW) and the Irish Football Association (IFA) have all previously objected to the premise over fears that the team would erode the independence of their individual football associations. However, members of its team have played for the Great Britain women's Olympic football team at London 2012 having been granted automatic qualification as the host nation.

An agreement in 2019 allows for England, as the highest-ranked home nation, to qualify an Olympic team on behalf of Great Britain. They successfully achieved this in time for Tokyo 2020 with England's result at the 2019 World Cup counting as the team's attempt to qualify. They qualified as one of the last three remaining European nations.

UEFA European Championship

England first entered the UEFA Women's Championship in 1984, reaching the final that year and subsequently in both 2009 and 2022. The team have reached the semi-finals on three other occasions (1987, 1995, 2017), but failed to make it out of the group stage in three other editions (2001, 2005, 2013). England did not qualify in 1989, 1991, 1993 and 1997.

*Draws include knockout matches decided by penalty shoot-outs.
**Red border colour denotes tournament was held on home soil.

Minor tournaments

FIFA world rankings

See also

Sport in England
Football in England
Women's football in England
Great Britain women's Olympic football team
England women's national under-23 football team
England women's national under-20 football team
England women's national under-19 football team
England women's national under-17 football team
England men's national football team

Notes

References

Further reading
 Aluko, Eniola (2019), They Don't Teach This, Random House, 
 Clarke, Gemma (2019), Soccerwomen: The Icons, Rebels, Stars, and Trailblazers Who Transformed the Beautiful Game, 
 Caudwell, Jayne (2013), Women's Football in the UK: Continuing with Gender Analyses, Taylor & Francis, 
 Dunn, Carrie (2019), Pride of the Lionesses: The Changing Face of Women's Football in England, Pitch Publishing (Brighton) Limited, 
 Dunn, Carrie (2016), The Roar of the Lionesses: Women's Football in England, Pitch Publishing Limited, 
 Dunn, Edwina (2017), The Female Lead: Women Who Shape Our World, Ebury Publishing, 
 Grainey, Timothy (2012), Beyond Bend It Like Beckham: The Global Phenomenon of Women's Soccer, University of Nebraska Press, 
 Stay, Shane (2019), The Women's World Cup 2019 Book: Everything You Need to Know About the Soccer World Cup, Books on Demand, 
 Theivam, Keiran and Jeff Kassouf (2019), The Making of the Women's World Cup: Defining stories from a sport's coming of age, Little,

External links
 

FIFA profile

 
European women's national association football teams
1972 establishments in England
1972 establishments in the United Kingdom
UEFA Women's Championship-winning countries